Matthew Scott "Matt" Besler (born February 11, 1987) is an American former professional soccer player. A left-sided central defender with the ability to play left-back. Besler spent the majority of his career in MLS with Sporting Kansas City. From 2013 to 2017, Besler represented the United States national team, including at the 2014 FIFA World Cup.

Youth and college
Besler was a four-year All-Conference player at Blue Valley West High School in Overland Park within Johnson County, Kansas. He led Blue Valley West to the Kansas 5A State Championship as a senior, scoring 23 goals with 19 assists, and holds the season and career marks in total points (124), goals (40) and assists (44) at Blue Valley West. He was also a member of the KCFC Alliance club team and a key member of the Region II Olympic Developmental Program (ODP) which competed in the 2004 ESP All-Star game.

Besler played college soccer at the University of Notre Dame, playing in 90 games (73 starts) and scoring 5 goals during his college career. He received All-American and Academic All-American honors as a senior, was named the NSCAA 2008 Senior College Men's Scholar All-America Player of the Year, and was named to the All Big East Team three times. He helped Notre Dame gain four straight berths in the NCAA championship, including the program's first two trips to the quarterfinals in 2006 and 2007.

Professional career
Besler was drafted in the first round (eighth overall) in the 2009 MLS SuperDraft by the Kansas City Wizards. He made his professional debut on March 28, 2009, as an 87th-minute substitute during a 2–1 loss at the Colorado Rapids. He scored his first professional goal on March 26, 2011, in a 3–2 loss to the Chicago Fire. Besler was added to the 2011 MLS All-Star team via the fan text message vote.
In 2012, Besler anchored the top defense in MLS with Sporting Kansas City and helped the club win the U.S. Open Cup by converting his attempt after the game against the Seattle Sounders went into penalty kicks. He also was named 2012 MLS Defender of the Year and part of the MLS Best XI.

On December 12, 2012, Besler re-signed with Sporting Kansas City on a three-year deal, passing up trial offers from Queens Park Rangers, Southampton, and Birmingham City.

Besler was voted into the 2013 All-Star Fan XI.

He was included in the roster for the July 2016 MLS All-Star Game.

Throughout the 2018 season, Besler became the all-time leader in each of the club's longevity categories, overtaking club legends such as Davy Arnaud and Kerry Zavagnin for games played, games started, and minutes played both in MLS play and in all competitions.
Kansas City opted not to renew Besler's contract following their 2020 season.

On January 6, 2021, Besler signed as a free agent with Austin FC ahead of their inaugural season in MLS. Following the 2021 season, Besler announced his retirement from playing professional soccer.

International career
On August 23, 2012, Besler was called up to the United States team by head coach Jürgen Klinsmann for a friendly against Mexico, but he did not appear in the match.
Besler made his debut appearance for the United States on January 29, 2013, in a friendly match against Canada.

Besler became the regular starting left-center back for the United States under head coach Jürgen Klinsmann. He was rated the top performer during the 2014 CONCACAF World Cup Qualifying matches.

On March 26, 2013, Besler made his debut World Cup qualifying appearance in a 0–0 draw at Mexico. On June 2, Besler started as the United States defeated Germany 4-3 in an international friendly played at RFK Stadium. Subsequently, Besler started in the World Cup qualifying wins against Jamaica, Panama, and Honduras.

After being left off of the initial roster for the 2013 CONCACAF Gold Cup so that the team could evaluate other players, Besler was added to strengthen the squad after the United States qualified for the knockout round.

Besler was selected for U.S. national team 23-man roster for the 2014 FIFA World Cup. He started all three games of the group stage and their Round of 16 games, helping the U.S. make it through the group stage for consecutive World Cups. Following his strong performance in the World Cup, several European outfits placed offers and expressed interest in signing Besler, including Freiburg, Fulham and Sunderland. Besler reportedly declined the offers and decided to stay in Kansas City.

He scored his debut national team goal on September 2, 2016, with an assist from Sporting Kansas City teammate Graham Zusi. This was the same day his first child was born.

Besler was a part of the U.S. national team that won the 2017 CONCACAF Gold Cup. Besler made four appearances in the tournament, including a start in the final as the U.S. beat Jamaica 2-1 on a late goal from Jordan Morris as Besler lifted his second international title.

International goals
Scores and results list United States' goal tally first.

Personal

Besler is known throughout his hometown of Kansas City for his willingness to give back to the community. On March 1, 2012, he joined forces with the Leukemia & Lymphoma Society (LLS) during the months of March, April and May for the Man of the Year campaign, raising funds for blood cancer research. In April 2012, Besler was named W.O.R.K.S. Humanitarian of the month by Major League Soccer.

He is a fan of his hometown Kansas City Chiefs and Royals. On July 5, 2013, he threw out the first pitch before the Kansas City Royals vs. Oakland Athletics baseball game.

His younger brother, Nick, was drafted by the Portland Timbers 5th overall in the 2015 MLS SuperDraft, and currently plays for fellow MLS club Real Salt Lake. He is currently represented by US & Asia-based agency, Libero Sports LLC.

Besler is Catholic. He was raised in a religious family; his father was Catholic and his mother converted from Methodism. Besler regularly attends church and is known to pray the rosary before each game. His favorite religious figures are Saint Christopher and Blessed Pier Giorgio Frassati. Besler married his wife, Amanda, at Visitation Catholic Church in December 2013, just two weeks after Besler led Sporting KC to their second ever MLS Cup title.

Career statistics

Honors
United States
 CONCACAF Gold Cup: 2013, 2017

Sporting Kansas City
 Lamar Hunt U.S. Open Cup: 2012, 2015, 2017
 MLS Cup: 2013

Individual
 Sporting Kansas City Defensive Player of the Year: 2011
 MLS Defender of the Year: 2012
 MLS Breakout Player of the Year: 2012
 MLS Best XI: 2012, 2013
 MLS All-Star: 2011, 2013, 2014, 2015

References

External links
 
 
 

1987 births
Living people
American soccer players
Notre Dame Fighting Irish men's soccer players
Sporting Kansas City players
Austin FC players
Sportspeople from Overland Park, Kansas
Soccer players from Kansas
Major League Soccer players
Major League Soccer All-Stars
Designated Players (MLS)
United States men's under-20 international soccer players
United States men's international soccer players
Sporting Kansas City draft picks
2013 CONCACAF Gold Cup players
2014 FIFA World Cup players
Copa América Centenario players
2017 CONCACAF Gold Cup players
CONCACAF Gold Cup-winning players
Association football defenders
All-American men's college soccer players
Catholics from Kansas